John Hamilton Dalrymple, 10th Earl of Stair, KT (1 April 1819 – 3 December 1903), styled Viscount Dalrymple from 1853 until 1864, was a Scottish peer and politician, who served as Governor of the Bank of Scotland for thirty-three years.

Biography
He was the eldest son of North Dalrymple, 9th Earl of Stair, and married Louisa-Jane-Henrietta-Emily, eldest daughter of the 3rd Duc de Coigny, in 1846. They had 6 children:

John Dalrymple, 11th Earl of Stair (1848–1914)
Lady Jane Georgina Dalrymple (1850 − 8 June 1914; twin), married Sir Arthur Vivian and had issue
Lady Anne Henrietta Dalrymple (1850 – 18 Feb 1899; twin), married Major-Gen. William Vesey Brownlow and had no issue
Hon. North de Coigny Dalrymple-Hamilton (31 October 1853 – 9 November 1906), married Marcia Liddell and had issue, including Frederick Dalrymple-Hamilton
Hon. Sir Hew Hamilton Dalrymple KCVO (27 September 1857 – 11 July 1945), unmarried and had no issue
Rev. the Hon. Robert McGill Dalrymple (b. 1862), Vicar of St. Stephen's Church, Sneinton, Nottingham

He represented Wigtownshire in Parliament from 1841 to 1856. He became Earl of Stair on the death of his father in 1864, and served as Lord Lieutenant of Ayrshire from 1870 to 1897. From 1870 to 1903 he was the Governor of the Bank of Scotland. After it was proposed in 1877, he successfully opposed the southward extension to Drummore of the Portpatrick and Wigtownshire Joint Railway. He also served as Lord High Commissioner to the Church of Scotland from 1869 to 1871. Between 1896 and 1902 he served as President of the Edinburgh conservation body the Cockburn Association.

References

Oliver & Boyd's new Edinburgh almanac and national repository for the year 1850. Oliver & Boyd, Edinburgh, 1850

External links

1819 births
1903 deaths
Earls of Stair
Knights of the Thistle
Lord-Lieutenants of Ayrshire
Chancellors of the University of Glasgow
Members of the Parliament of the United Kingdom for Scottish constituencies
UK MPs 1841–1847
UK MPs 1847–1852
UK MPs 1852–1857
UK MPs who inherited peerages
Governors of the Bank of Scotland
Lords High Commissioner to the General Assembly of the Church of Scotland
19th-century Scottish businesspeople